Kimberly Steward is an American film producer known for such films as Through a Lens Darkly: Black Photographers and the Emergence of a People (2014). She also produced Manchester by the Sea in 2016 through her production company, K Period Media, in which she was nominated for an Academy Award. Steward is a member of the board of trustees of the Academy Museum of Motion Pictures.

Steward is the daughter of billionaire businessman David Steward, founder of the systems integration firm World Wide Technology.

Filmography
She was a producer in all films unless otherwise noted.

Film

Thanks

Television

References

External links

Living people
American documentary film producers
African-American film producers
American women documentary filmmakers
Year of birth missing (living people)
21st-century African-American people
21st-century African-American women